Notommoides is a genus of tephritid  or fruit flies in the family Tephritidae.

Species
Notommoides albida
Notommoides pallidiseta

References

Trypetinae
Tephritidae genera